Rumen Rangelov (born 30 November 1985) is a Bulgarian footballer who plays 
as a forward for Lokomotiv Mezdra.

Career
Rangelov spent most of his career at his hometown club Botev Vratsa, where he last played until June 2018.

References

External links
 

1985 births
Living people
People from Vratsa
Bulgarian footballers
First Professional Football League (Bulgaria) players
Second Professional Football League (Bulgaria) players
FC Botev Vratsa players
FC Lokomotiv 1929 Sofia players
FC Chavdar Etropole players
PFC Minyor Pernik players
Association football forwards